Michal Martychowiec (born 1987) is a contemporary artist. He creates conceptual series of photographs, films, drawings, neons, objects, and mix-media installations and environments. He was awarded Distinction in MA Fine Art from Central Saint Martins College of Art and Design in London. He is a visiting lecturer at the Russian Institute of History of Art (Russian Academy of Sciences) in St. Petersburg and China Academy of Art  in Hangzhou. He lives in Berlin.

Work 

Martychowiec’s oeuvre consists of mixed media practice designed in larger series. It is thus always developed hermeneutically around an expanded topic. A new field of his invention is also recreation of avatars and other personas.

Through this practice, characterized by the diversity of the media used, Martychowiec aims to explore the condition and the possibilities of contemporary human existence. His thinking revolves around history, invention and autopoiesis of historical narratives and thus also exploration and occasionally comical recomposition of cultural symbols and archetypes.

Furthermore, Martychowiec merges artistic and curatorial practices through a twofold arrangement of his oeuvre. At first, he develops projects as individual narratives within a certain field of inquiry. At the same time, these projects inform one another and their elements can be reenacted and incorporated, through a curatorial activity, into later works, where they acquire symbolic qualities.

Martychowiec’s inventions are based primarily on Occidental and Oriental philosophy, anthropology, art and cultural history, universal historical reflections, the history of religion, literature, archeology and, of course, our contemporary culture and communication analysis.

References

External links 

 personal website 
 MMS2 Berlin
 Gallery De Sarthe Beijing/Honk Kong
 Bublitz

Polish contemporary artists
Polish photographers
British installation artists
Photographers from Berlin
British mixed media artists
Living people
1987 births